Anisoceras is a heteromorph ammonite belonging to the turrilitoid family Anisoceratidae. The shell forms a loose open helical spiral in the early stages, ending in one or two straight shafts in the mature adult. Surface ornament consists of  prominent rounded nodes on the lower and upper flanks, connected by strong looped ribs. The nodes may have been the bases of long sharp spines.

References

Marcinowski and Wiedmann. The Albian Ammonites of Poland. Palaeontologia Polonica no. 50, 1990
 The Paleobiology Database Anisoceras entry

Ammonitida genera
Cretaceous ammonites
Ammonites of Australia
Albian genus first appearances
Turonian genus extinctions
Cenomanian genera
Fossil taxa described in 1854
Turrilitoidea